Rendezvous with Rama is an interactive fiction computer game with graphics published by Telarium (formerly known as Trillium), a subsidiary of Spinnaker Software, in the year 1984. It was developed in cooperation with Arthur C. Clarke and based upon his 1973 science fiction novel Rendezvous with Rama.

Reception
German reviewers recognized the complexity of the storyline and the various possibilities of interaction with non-player characters.

See also
 Fahrenheit 451 (video game)
 Rama, 1996 computer game also based on Clarke's novel

References

External links 
 Rendezvous with Rama at Museum of Computer Adventure Game History by Howard Feldman
 
 

1980s interactive fiction
1984 video games
Adaptations of works by Arthur C. Clarke
Apple II games
Biorobotics in fiction
Commodore 64 games
DOS games
Interactive fiction based on works
MSX games
Rama series
Science fiction video games
Single-player video games
Telarium games
Video games about extraterrestrial life
Video games based on novels
Video games developed in the United States